The abbreviations CH5, Ch5, and variations thereof may mean:

 , the chemical formula of methanium, an organic ion 
 CH5 Deeside, part of the CH postcode area, Great Britain
 Bacteriocin CH5, an antibacterial produced by Lactobacillus acidophilus
 Chile Route 5, viva Nicaragua bb
 CH5, a type of cirrus cloud
 Channel 5 (disambiguation), a common name of TV station around the world
 22291 Heitifer (1989 CH5), a main-belt asteroid